The Other Side of Time is the debut solo album from the American singer-songwriter Mary Fahl, released on May 27, 2003 by the newly formed Sony Odyssey label. The album reached No. 22 on the Billboard Heatseekers chart and No. 269 on BillboardsTop Internet Albums.

History
After performing as a solo artist in the late 90s and releasing the EP Lenses of Contact in 2001, Fahl was signed with Sony Classical.

Upon finding out Sony Classical would be releasing the soundtrack to the film Gods and Generals, Fahl researched the story and wrote the song "Going Home" on speculation.

Three of the songs from Lenses of Contact were featured in The Other Side of Time, and two songs would figure prominently on film soundtracks.  "Going Home" appeared in the opening of Gods and Generals; the album's closing track, Fahl's version of the traditional Irish tune "The Dawning of the Day," was featured in The Guys, along with several reprises of the song.

The Other Side of Time showed some additional sides to Fahl's style, bringing in opera styles in "Una furtiva lagrima" and Middle Eastern influences in "Ben Aindi Habibi".  These two tracks, which Fahl sang in Italian and Mozarabic respectively, were the first non-English language songs to appear on her records.  "Ben Aindi Habibi" was a traditional kharja written in the 11th or 12th century. Fahl said in an interview that she had discovered "Ben Aindi Habibi" while on tour with the October Project and considered it her favorite song on The Other Side of Time.

In an interview with Liane Hansen of National Public Radio, Fahl stated that she performed these songs on The Other Side of Time because she was signed to a classical label and a pop label would not have let her make that type of record.

"Paolo" was written in 1997, one of the first songs she'd composed, and is considered by Fahl to be the most autobiographical of her repertoire.

"The Dawning of the Day" was written for the film adaptation of The Guys in honor of the firefighters who died in the September 11 attacks.  The film's director, Jim Simpson, stipulated that the song sound like it was written 300 years ago.  Fahl wrote the lyrics within the two-day deadline. Fahl admits to being moved to tears while writing the lyrics.

Fahl wrote her lyrics to "The Dawning of the Day" to honor firefighters who died in the September 11, 2001 attacks. The song would later be performed by Ronan Tynan at the re-opening dedication for the Seven World Trade Center in 2006.

Reception

Overall, The Other Side of Time met with mixed reviews.  Film Score Monthly called her "a brasher, more exciting version of Enya and Sissel" and concluded, "Mary Fahl, thankfully, is not your typical pop singer. Somewhat unwieldy, but always interesting. More filmmakers should pay attention to the vocal talent on display in this CD." The All-Music Guide praised her past work with the October Project and her first solo EP but gave her only 2 out of 5 stars for The Other Side of Time, saying, "She still has the big voice, but she's opting for an easier course of being eclectic by tossing faint nods at different styles while trying to hew firmly to the center of the road.... This just ends up being a bland waste of a mighty talent."

After listening to the first four tracks of the album, MusicTap's Matt Rowe described himself as "mesmerized," comparing Fahl's "entrancing voice" to that of Lisa Gerrard's of Dead Can Dance fame.  He found the majority of the album rich with "philosophical lyrics" and "spiritual airing," calling Fahl a "unique talent" on a "quest for answers that emulate the basic need of man to know things usually beyond our understanding."

Track list

PersonnelMusicians and vocalists Rob Mathes – piano, electric guitar, keyboards
 Dennis McDermott – drums
 Mark O'Connor – violin, soloist
 Shawn Pelton – drums, drum Loop
 Larry Saltzman – electric guitar
 Jimi Zhivago – electric guitar
 James McCollum – guitar
 Paul Intson – bass (upright)
 Alan Hewitt (musician) – percussion, keyboards
 Glenn Patscha – piano, background vocals, keyboards
 Alvin Young – bass
 Henry Aronson – piano
 David Berger – drums
 Byron Isaacs – bass, bowed bass, background vocals, guitar
 Fiona McBain – background vocals
 Pamelia Kurstin – theremin, soloist
 Mary Fahl – vocals
 Iki Levy – percussion, drum loop
 Tony Garnier – bass
 Kevin Kuhn – guitar
 John Lissauer – bass, guitar, conductor, keyboards, choir, dholak, shruti box, orchestral arrangements, talking drum, shaker, engineer, tambourine, harmonium, percussion
 Mark Egan – electric bass
 Glenn Alexander – acoustic guitar, guitar
 Ramsey McLean – guitar
 Oren Bloedow – guitar
 Richard Locker – cello, soloist, orchestra
 Scott Healy – piano, keyboards
 Paul Cremo – electric guitar, executive producerProduction Mychael Danna – arranger, producer
 Ed Rak – engineer
 David Tickle – record producer, remixing
 David Wilkes – artist consultant
 Brad Haehnel – engineer
 Ron Searles – engineer
 Jeffrey Lesser – mixing, engineer, producer, background vocals
 Janush Kawa – photography
 Nick Vaccaro – photography
 Anthony Ruotolo – associate engineer
 Keith Shortreed – digital editing
 Jan Folkson – engineer, digital editing, metal shaker
 Ian Cuttler – art direction
 Ricardo Fernandez – associate engineer
 Robert Nowak – copyist
 Robin Pitre – copyist
 Dan Abernathy – associate engineer
 Edmund Cionek – copyist
 Ruth DeSarno – A&R assistance
 Nic Hard – engineer
 Erich Trusheim – associate engineer
 Jeremy Welch – associate engineer
 Joshua Benezra – intern
 Anne Atalla – A&ROrchestra'

 Karen Milne
 John Moses
 Joe Passaro
 Sue Pray
 Jim Saporito
 Laura Seaton
 Kirk Worthington – cello
 Dale Stuckenbruck
 Maxine Roach
 Sarah Adams
 Rick Dolan
 Richard Clark
 Caryl Paisner
 Belinda Whitney
 Helen Campo
 Ken Barward Hoy
 Don McGeen
 Xin Zhao
 Adam Grabois
 Laura Oatts
 Stacy Shames
 Larry Di Bello
 David Earl Taylor
 Shelly Holland-Moritz
 Natalie Cenovia Cummins
 Elizabeth Lim Dutton
 Robert Bush
 Leise Paer
 John Miller – conductor
 Mark Sherman
 Martin Agee
 Dennis Anderson
 Randy Andos
 Joseph Bongiorno
 H. Robert Carlisle
 Barry Finclair
 Joyce Hammann
 Karl Kawahara
 Jeanne LeBlanc

Charts

References

2003 debut albums
Mary Fahl albums